Drosophila pseudoargentostriata is a species of fruit fly in the genus Drosophila, described by Wheeler in 1981.

References

pseudoargentostriata